The Alte Burg ("Old Castle") near Lommersdorf in the municipality of Blankenheim in the county of Euskirchen in the German state of North Rhine-Westphalia is a levelled mediaeval castle site.

The site lies about 900 metres north of the River Ahr, above the village of Ahrhütte in the valley of the Mühlenbach on the L 105 country road.

The spur castle, which covered a small area, probably goes back to the Late Middle Ages. According to Janssen, the two-part structure belongs to the "two-part motte group (Gruppe der zweiteiligen Motten). But its small size is unusual for the genre. On the small, conical hill, just four metres in diameter on a hilltop plateau, was most likely to have been a tower. In 1928, Wackenroder confirmed that there were still stone remains that pointed to a former wall. The site has not yet been investigated archaeologically, but there are now no wall remains or other solid remains to be seen.

A family, the von Lommersdorfs are recorded in deeds dating to 1455 and 1478 which mention a John of Lommersdorf. Whethere there is a connexion between him and the castle is not certain. The site may have been linked to the quarrying of brown iron ore, which was then smelted in the nearby ironworks.

References

Literature 
 Harald Herzog: Burgen und Schlösser, Geschichte und Typologie der Adelssitze im Kreis Euskirchen. Rheinland-Verlag. Cologne, 1989. . p. 378.
 Walter Janssen: Studien zur Wüstungsfrage im fränkischen Altsiedelland zwischen Rhein, Mosel und Eifelnordrand. (=Bonner Jahrbücher, Beiheft 35) Rheinland Verlag, Cologne, 1975, Part II, pp. 73ff.
 Ernst Wackenroder: Die Kunstdenkmäler des Kreises Schleiden. (=Die Kunstdenkmäler der Rheinprovinz. Vol. 11, Part II). Schwann, 1932 (reprinted 1982 ). p. 239.

External links 
 
 

Castles in North Rhine-Westphalia
Castles in the Eifel
Buildings and structures in Euskirchen (district)